Relluna nurella is a moth in the family Cossidae, and the only species in the genus Relluna. It is found in the north-eastern Himalayas, as well as on Peninsular Malaysia, Borneo and Palawan.

The forewings and hindwings are uniform brownish fawn, except for a pale yellow area along the dorsum of the forewings.

Subspecies
Relluna nurella nurella
Relluna nurella wallacei Yakovlev, 2008 (Myanmar, Malaysia, Borneo, Sumatra)

Etymology
The genus name is an anagram of the species-name nurella.

References

 , 2004: Cossidae of Thailand. Part 1. (Lepidoptera: Cossidae). Atalanta 35 (3-4): 335-351.
 , 2009: The Carpenter Moths (Lepidoptera:Cossidae) of Vietnam. Entomofauna Supplement 16: 11-32.
Natural History Museum Lepidoptera generic names catalog

Zeuzerinae